La Plaza de Paraguachí is a town on Isla Margarita, in the state of Nueva Esparta, Venezuela. It is the capital of the Antolín del Campo Municipality.

Populated places in Nueva Esparta
Margarita Island